Pánská jízda  is a Czech comedy film directed by Martin Kotík. It was released in 2004.

Cast 
Martin Dejdar
Vladimír Škultéty
Josef Abrhám
Světlana Nálepková
Petr Martinák
Petra Špalková

References

External links
 

2004 films
2004 comedy films
Czech comedy films
2000s Czech films